Lupo Alberto (in English Alberto the Wolf), is an Italian animated series produced by The Animation Band in co-production with France 2 for the first season, which was based on the original comic books of the same name. Originally aired in Rai from 1997 to 2002, it was composed of 104 episodes divided into two seasons. Below is the list of episodes.

Season 1 (1997-1998)

Season 2 (2002)

Lupo Alberto